Shiraj Mahalleh may refer to:
 Shiraj Mahalleh-ye Bozorg
 Shiraj Mahalleh-ye Kuchak